Chagari Praveen Kumar is an Indian Judge. Presently, he is Judge of Andhra Pradesh High Court. He has served as the Acting Chief Justice of Andhra Pradesh High Court.

Career 
Justice Chagari Praveen Kumar was born on 26 February 1961. He passed B.Sc., L.L.B. He was enrolled as an Advocate on 28 February 1986. He practiced in the Andhra Pradesh High Court (now High Court of Telangana) in criminal and constitutional matters for over 25 years. He was appointed an Additional Judge of the Telangana High Court on June 29, 2012. He was appointed a Permanent Judge of the Telangana High Court on December 4, 2013. He chose Andhra Pradesh High Court after bifurcation of High Court of Judicature at Hyderabad into Andhra Pradesh High Court and Telangana High Court. He was appointed acting Chief Justice of newly formed Andhra Pradesh High Court on 1 January 2019.

References 

1961 births
Living people
Andhra Pradesh High Court
Indian judges